The 1936 World Table Tennis Championships men's singles was the tenth edition of the men's singles championship. 

Stanislav Kolář defeated Alojzy Ehrlich in the final, winning three sets to two to secure the title.

Results

See also
List of World Table Tennis Championships medalists

References

-